Vanash-e Bala (also Romanized as Vanāsh-e Bālā; also known as Vanāsh) is a village in Alamut-e Pain Rural District, Rudbar-e Alamut District, Qazvin County, Qazvin Province, Iran.  At the 2006 census, its population was 51, in 19 families.

References 

Populated places in Qazvin County